The 2005 Viennese state election was held on 23 October 2005 to elect the members of the Gemeinderat and Landtag of Vienna.

The governing Social Democratic Party of Austria (SPÖ) led by Mayor and Governor Michael Häupl won a landslide victory, increasing its absolute majority by an additional three seats and winning just under half of the vote. The Freedom Party of Austria (FPÖ) suffered substantial losses, falling from second to fourth place. The Austrian People's Party (ÖVP) returned to second place for the first time since 1991. The Greens achieved their best-ever result, winning 14.6% of votes and becoming the third largest party in the Gemeinderat and Landtag.

Background
The Viennese constitution mandates that cabinet positions in the city government (city councillors) be allocated between parties proportionally in accordance with the share of votes won by each; this is known as Proporz. The number of city councillors is voted upon by the Landtag after each election, and may legally vary between nine and fifteen. City councillors are divided into two groups – "senior" councillors, who hold a cabinet portfolio, and "non-executive" councillors who do not. Non-executive councillors may vote in cabinet meetings, but do not otherwise hold any government responsibility. In practice, parties seek to form a coalition which holds a majority in both the Landtag and city government. City councillors bound to the coalition become senior councillors, while the opposition are relegated to non-executive status.

In the 2001 state election, the SPÖ regained the absolute majority it had lost in 1996. The FPÖ suffered substantial losses, but remained the second largest party with 20% of the vote. The Greens also made gains, with the Liberal Forum lost its seats. The SPÖ won nine city councillors and formed government alone.

Electoral system
The 100 seats of the Gemeinderat and Landtag of Vienna are elected via open list proportional representation in a two-step process. The seats are distributed between eighteen multi-member constituencies. For parties to receive any representation in the Landtag, they must either win at least one seat in a constituency directly, or clear a 5 percent state-wide electoral threshold. Seats are distributed in constituencies according to the Hare quota, with any remaining seats allocated using the D'Hondt method at the state level, to ensure overall proportionality between a party's vote share and its share of seats.

Contesting parties
The table below lists parties represented in the previous Landtag.

In addition to the parties already represented in the Landtag, four parties collected enough signatures to be placed on the ballot.

 Communist Party of Austria (KPÖ)
 Alliance for the Future of Austria (BZÖ)
 Vienna Forum (WIF) – on the ballot only in Donaustadt
 Socialist Left Party (SLP) – on the ballot only in Centre

Results

Results by constituency

References

2005 elections in Austria
State elections in Austria
October 2005 events in Europe
Politics of Vienna